Ouhai District is a district of Wenzhou, Zhejiang. It is an outlying district of Wenzhou urban area.

It has a population of 386,000 and occupies .

Administrative divisions
Twelve subdistricts:
Louqiao Subdistrict, Xinqiao Subdistrict, Wutian Subdistrict, Jingshan Subdistrict, Chashan Subdistrict, Sanyang Subdistrict, Nanbaixiang Subdistrict, Quxi Subdistrict, Panqiao Subdistrict, Guoxi Subdistrict, Li'ao Subdistrict, Xianyan Subdistrict

The only town is Zeya

Culture
An essay written by Zhu Ziqing on the beauty of Meiyu Pond and waterfall in the Middle Yandang Mountains in Xianyan Subdistrict, Ouhai District after his visits to the area in 1923 is among the sixty potential reading selections test takers may be asked to read for the Putonghua Proficiency Test.

References

Districts of Zhejiang
Geography of Wenzhou